The Games + Learning + Society (GLS) Conference is an academic conference. The conference is now held annually at the University of California Irvine. From 2003 to 2016, the conference was held at the University of Wisconsin-Madison. The founder and chair is Constance Steinkuehler.

For nearly two decades, the GLS conference has been a premier venue for those who create and research digital learning media inspired by games. Specifically, they examine how games can be used to transform how people learn and what implications that knowledge has for society. The conference's mission is to foster substantive discussion and collaboration among academics, designers, and educators interested in how videogames - commercial games and others—can enhance learning, culture, and education. The newly relaunched GLS Center and Conference in 2022 has a specific focus on tackling questions brought about by the recent global pandemic and a period of reckoning in the United States with systemic racisms and inequities.

References

External links 
 Official GLS Conference website
 Games+Learning+Society (GLS) Center website
 http://www.textuality.org/archive/2006/06/gameslearningsoc.html
 http://terranova.blogs.com/terra_nova/2005/06/gls_conference.html
 http://www.psychochild.org/index.php?p=61
 UW-Madison hosting seventh annual Games+Learning+Society conference
 http://playmakelearn.org/

Video game culture
Recurring events established in 2005
Academic conferences
Computer conferences